Martin Dvořáček (born 15 November 1972) is a Czech former professional tennis player.

Born in Brno, Dvořáček made appearances on the satellite tour during the early 1990s. 

Dvořáček joined Oklahoma State University in 1996 and formed a doubles partnership with countryman Pavel Kudrnáč which would top the collegiate rankings. He was a two-time doubles silver medalist at the World University Games.

Following his time in Oklahoma he ended up in New York and was a local wildcard entrant in doubles for the 2001 Hamlet Cup, an ATP Tour tournament on Long Island.

Dvořáček is married to former professional tennis player Veronika Dvořáčková (nee Šafářová) and both teach tennis at The Powelton Club in Newburgh, New York. His sister in law is Lucie Šafářová.

References

External links
 
 

1972 births
Living people
Czech male tennis players
Oklahoma State Cowboys tennis players
Sportspeople from Brno
Medalists at the 1993 Summer Universiade
Competitors at the 1995 Summer Universiade
Medalists at the 1997 Summer Universiade
Universiade medalists in tennis
Universiade silver medalists for the Czech Republic